10/10 (or 10 sur 10) is a song by Congolese-French singer and rapper Maître Gims featuring French rappers, Dadju and Alonzo.

Charts

Certifications

References 

2020 songs
2020 singles
French-language songs
Gims songs
Songs written by Renaud Rebillaud
Songs written by Gims
Dadju songs